The Ambato River is a river of Ecuador. It flows near the city of Ambato. It empties into the Pastaza River, and ultimately via the Amazon into the Atlantic Ocean.

See also
List of rivers of Ecuador

References
 Rand McNally, The New International Atlas, 1993.
  GEOnet Names Server
 Water Resources Assessment of Ecuador

Rivers of Ecuador